ν Leonis, Latinised as Nu Leonis, is a binary star system in the zodiac constellation of Leo. It is faintly visible to the naked eye with an apparent visual magnitude of 5.15; parallax measurements indicate it is around 500 light years away. At this distance, the visual extinction from interstellar dust is 0.33 magnitudes.

It is 0.05 degree north of the ecliptic, so it can be occulted by the moon or planets.

This is a single-lined spectroscopic binary system with an orbital period of 137.3 days and an eccentricity of 0.7. The primary component is a B-type subgiant star with a stellar classification of B6 IV. It has about 3.37 times the mass of the Sun, 2.3 times the Sun's radius, and radiates 244 times the luminosity of the Sun from an outer atmosphere with an effective temperature of 9,552 K. The rotation rate is moderate with a projected rotational velocity of 100 km/s. Little is known about the companion.

References

B-type subgiants
Spectroscopic binaries
Leo (constellation)
Leonis, Nu
Leonis, 27
086360
048883
3937
Durchmusterung objects